Baget RTOS (rus. ОСРВ Багет) is a real-time operating system developed by the Scientific Research Institute of System Development of the Russian Academy of Sciences for a MIPS architecture (Baget-MIPS variant) and Intel board support packages (BSPs) (x86 architecture). Baget is intended for software execution in a hard real-time embedded systems (firmware).

X Window System (client and server) was ported to Baget. It also has ethernet support (Network File System (NFS), File Transfer Protocol (FTP), Telnet protocols), long filename File Allocation Table (VFAT) and a tar file systems, floppy disk drive (FDD) and hard disk drive (HDD) driver support. Several supported network cards are limited by some Realtek Industry Standard Architecture (ISA) and Peripheral Component Interconnect (PCI) cards.

The development process is based on the following principles:
 international standards compliance
 portability
 Scalability
 Microkernel
 Object-oriented programming
 Cross-platform development

Standards compliance 
 Portable Operating System Interface (POSIX) 1003.1, standard (application programming interface (API)),
 C standard programming language and libraries.

See also 
 Comparison of real-time operating systems

External links 
 NIISI RAS Baget RTOS
 NIISI RAS
 MCST-R500 1 GHz CPU for Baget RTOS

Real-time operating systems
Embedded operating systems
Microkernel-based operating systems
Microkernels
MIPS operating systems